Cao Dan (born in 1960 in Wuhan, Hubei province) is a contemporary Chinese painter. Cao Dan graduated from Hubei Institute of Fine Arts, Wuhan, China in 1982, and is currently teaching as a professor there.

Currently, Cao Dan is working on a series called Butterfly Effect. This title refers to the short story A Sound of Thunder (1952) by Ray Bradbury, in which a small change, such as butterfly flapping its wings, causes a series of major changes. Cao Dan projects this idea on contemporary changes in world economics and the sudden resistance to the label made in China and all its possible connotations. Additionally, in traditional Chinese culture the butterfly is seen as an analogy of female consciousness. This series represents women penetrating in men's product area. These works are executed in an instantly recognisable style, using bright primary colors.

Selected solo exhibitions

 2008	
 “Butterfly File”, Hubei Institute of Fine Arts, Wuhan, China
 “Hubei!”, Edward Pranger Oriental Art Gallery, Amsterdam, The Netherlands

Selected group exhibitions

 2008	
 “Wuhan 2008 Contemporary Art Invitational Exhibition”, Hubei Institute of Fine Arts, Wuhan, China
 2007
 “Forms of Concepts: The Reform of Concepts of Chinese Contemporary Art 1987-2007－The New Generation and Bad Art”, 2007 Wuhan 2nd Documentary Exhibition of Fine Arts, Wuhan, China
 “The 8th China Art Festival. Fifty Anniversaries of Art Exhibition of Hubei Artists Association”, Wuhan, China
 The 3rd Academic Art Exhibition, Hubei Institute of Fine Arts, Wuhan, China
1995
 “Twenty Anniversaries”, International Art Exhibition, Nanjing, China
 1994
 The 8th Hubei Art Exhibition, Wuhan, China
 1993
‘93 Chinese Oil Painting Biennale Exhibition, China Art Gallery, Beijing, China
 1991
 Oil Painting Exhibition, Wuhan, China
 1989
 “China/Avant-garde Art Exhibition”, National Art Museum of China, Beijing
 Contemporary Art Exhibition of Five Chinese Artists in USA
 1988	
 Hubei Oil Painting Exhibition, Wuhan, China
 1987
 Hubei Youth Art Festival Exhibition, Beijing, China
 1986
 “Tribe. Tribe First Round Exhibition”, Wuhan, China
 1985
 The 6th China National Art Exhibition, Beijing, China

References
Wei Guangqing (2008), Butterfly Effect. Hubei: Hubei Fine Arts Publishing. 

Painters from Hubei
Living people
1960 births
Artists from Wuhan